The 1960 USC Trojans football team represented the University of Southern California (USC) in the 1960 NCAA University Division football season. In their first year under head coach John McKay, the Trojans compiled a 4–6 record (3–1 against conference opponents), finished in second place in the Athletic Association of Western Universities, and were outscored by their opponents by a combined total of 152 to 95.

Bill Nelsen led the team in passing with 29 of 72 passes completed for 446 yards, three touchdowns and three interceptions. Marlin McKeever was the leading receiver with 15 catches for 218 yards. Hal Tobin was the leading rusher with 318 yard on 61 carries.

Schedule

Personnel

Season summary

Oregon State

TCU

at Ohio State

References

USC
USC Trojans football seasons
USC Trojans football